Corio railway station is located on the Warrnambool line in Victoria, Australia. It serves the northern Geelong suburb of Corio, and it opened on 15 September 1890 as Cowie's Creek. It was renamed Cowie on 9 May 1904, and renamed Corio on 1 December 1913.

A siding just north of the School Road level crossing was opened in April 1912, and a tramway was constructed from there to the new Corio site of Geelong Grammar School, to facilitate the carting of building materials. At the end of 1913, the station was moved 400 metres down the line, in conjunction with the establishment of a crossing loop on the single track. The relocation of Geelong Grammar School to its new site on 8 January 1914 helped to further increase the station's importance. A station-master's residence was constructed, and a station-master and assistant station-master were appointed.

In the early 1950s, Corio's role was boosted by the construction of the Shell Geelong refinery, with its associated sidings, immediately adjacent to the station. In February 1959, the line from North Geelong to Corio was duplicated. When duplication was extended to Lara on 9 September 1981, a new island platform and station building were provided.

In 1964, flashing light signals were provided at the School Road level crossing, located nearby in the Up direction of the station, with boom barriers provided later on in 1981.

On 4 January 2001, Corio was de-staffed.

The Western standard gauge line to Adelaide runs immediately west of the station.

Although located in Corio, the station is situated about a kilometre from the nearest residential developments in the area.

Platforms and services

Corio has one island platform with two faces. It is serviced by V/Line Geelong line and selected Warrnambool line services.

Platform 1:
  services to Southern Cross

Platform 2:
  services to Geelong, South Geelong, Marshall and Waurn Ponds
  one weekend morning service to Warrnambool

On weekdays during off-peak, customers wanting to travel to North Shore must either change at Lara or North Geelong due to services stopping at Corio skipping North Shore.

References

External links
Victorian Railway Stations gallery

Railway stations in Geelong
Railway stations in Australia opened in 1890
Regional railway stations in Victoria (Australia)